The Elliott Hills are a group of low hills and nunataks,  long, that mark the northwest end of the Gutenko Mountains, in central Palmer Land, Antarctica. They were mapped by the United States Geological Survey in 1974, and were named by the Advisory Committee on Antarctic Names for Lieutenant Commander David J. Elliott, U.S. Navy, Commander of LC-130 aircraft in aerial photographic and ice-sensing flights over extensive areas of the Antarctic continent during Operation Deep Freeze, 1970 and 1971.

References 

Hills of Palmer Land
Nunataks of Palmer Land